Liga 3, organized by Georgian Football Federation since 1990, is the third division of professional football in Georgia.

Until 2017, when the current name was introduced, it was known as Meore Liga (the Second league).

Structure and league system
There were 20 teams competing in the league in 2017. In 2019, when Liga 4 was formed, their number was reduced to ten, although after two seasons GFF decided to extend the league to 14 at the expense of two bottom teams from the previous season and two second-placed clubs from Liga 4 While and Red Groups. For 2022 the number of clubs was increased to 16.

Seasons run based on Spring-Autumn system with each team playing an equal amount of home and away games against their league rivals.

The league operates based on a system of promotion and relegation. Starting from the 2022 season, champions and runners-up win automatic promotion to Erovnuli Liga 2, while the teams that finish in the third and fourth positions book a place in promotion play-off home and away games against respectively the 8th and 7th placed clubs of Liga 2. Three bottom teams are relegated to Liga 4.

In case two or more clubs obtain the same number of points, their head-to-head records are next to be taken into consideration.

Number of teams each season
● 2017-18 = 20 

● 2019-20 = 10

● 2021 = 14

● 2022 = 16

Current members 

Sixteen teams will compete in Liga 3 for the 2023 season. Four of them had previously played in the top division, namely Borjomi, Chikhura, Guria Lanchkhuti and Zestafoni. There are also three reserve teams of higher league members this season.   

Clubs are listed below in alphabetical order:

Results

Group Winners of Meore Liga 

 Note: Due to the season being transitional in 2016, none of the teams was promoted

Top three teams of Liga 3 

 
Notes: Apart from the champions who were automatically promoted to the second division, the teams indicated in bold gained promotion after winning the play-offs against their Liga-2 rivals. Due to the changed format in 2022, the runner-ups of the season were also promoted directly.

Relegated teams 
The number of relegated teams per each recent season varies due to the fact that the competition format is subject to frequent changes.

Note: Tbilisi City failed to obtain a league license for the 2023 season.

Participation per club
Including the 2023 season there have been 44 teams in total competing in this league since 2017. Gori are topping the list with an overall eight-year continuous tenure in the third tier, including all the seven seasons after its re-branding as Liga 3. 

As of 2023 their current status is:

References

External links 
 
 Soccerway.com

 
3
Geo